José Sigona Torres (born 18 June 1953) bussines man. Actually Grupo Empresarial Sigona´s CEO. 40 years ago he founded, and keeps in charge of, Transmisiones y Equipos Industriales, S.A. de C.V. TEISA in México, one of the biggest pump and power distributors in México City and 7 major cities in the country.

References

1953 births
Living people
National Autonomous University of Mexico alumni
University of Valencia alumni